Glacial polish is a characteristic of rock surfaces where glaciers have passed over bedrock, typically granite or other hard igneous or metamorphic rock. Moving ice will carry pebbles and sand grains removed from upper levels which in turn grind a smooth or grooved surface upon the underlying rock. The presence of such polish indicates that the glaciation was relatively recent (in geologic time scale) or was subsequently protected by deposition, as such polish will be subsequently lost due to weathering processes (such as exfoliation).

See also
Glacial striation

References

Glaciology